Krätschmer is a German language occupational surname  for a innkeeper and may refer to:
Ernst-Günther Krätschmer (1920–1984), German SS-officer
Pius Krätschmer (1997), American scientist
Wolfgang Krätschmer (1942), German physicist

References 

German-language surnames
Occupational surnames